Karl Bengt Rask (born 28 April 1928) is a retired Swedish swimmer who won a bronze medal relay medals in the 200 m breaststroke at the 1950 European Aquatics Championships. Two years later he competed in the same event at the 1952 Summer Olympics but was eliminated in the preliminaries.

References

1928 births
Living people
Swimmers at the 1952 Summer Olympics
Swedish male breaststroke swimmers
Olympic swimmers of Sweden
European Aquatics Championships medalists in swimming
Stockholms KK swimmers
Swimmers from Stockholm